The Blue Java (also known as blue bananas, Ice Cream banana, Vanilla Banana, Hawaiian banana, Ney Mannan, Krie, or Cenizo) is a hardy, cold-tolerant banana cultivar known for its sweet aromatic fruit, which is said to have an ice cream-like consistency and flavor reminiscent of vanilla. It is native to Southeast Asia and is a hybrid of two species of banana native to Southeast Asia — Musa balbisiana and Musa acuminata.

Taxonomy and nomenclature

The Blue Java banana is a triploid (ABB) hybrid of the seeded banana Musa balbisiana and Musa acuminata.

Its accepted name is Musa acuminata × balbisiana (ABB Group) 'Blue Java'.

Synonyms include:
 Musa acuminata × balbisiana (ABB Group) 'Ice Cream'

In Hawaii it is known as the 'Ice Cream banana' and in Fiji as the 'Hawaiian banana'. It is also called 'Krie' in the Philippines and 'Cenizo' in Central America.

Description

They are cold-tolerant and are wind-resistant because of their strong pseudostems and root systems. The leaves are silvery green in color.

The fruit bunches are small, bearing seven to nine hands. The fruit turn a pale yellow when ripe, with white creamy flesh. They bloom around 15 to 24 months after planting and can be harvested after 115 to 150 days.

Uses

Blue Java bananas are popular bananas that can be eaten fresh or cooked. They are known for their fragrant flavour which has a vanilla-like custard taste. The fruit goes well with ice cream.

They are also popular as ornamentals and shade plants for their unusual blue coloration, large size, and tolerance to temperate climates.

Pests and diseases

Common pests
 Borers
 Grasshoppers
 Root-knot nematode

Common diseases
 Panama disease
 Black sigatoka

See also

 List of banana cultivars
 Plantain (disambiguation)
 Saba banana

References

Australian cuisine
Banana cultivars